The Island Council is the legislature of the Pitcairn Islands.

Structure
The Council has ten members, seven (five Councillors, the Mayor, and the Deputy Mayor) of whom are elected by popular vote and are the only members that are allowed to vote during any Council meeting. The other three are ex-officio members: the Administrator (who serves as both the head of government and the representative of the Governor of the Pitcairn Islands), the Governor, and the Deputy Governor. The Councillors and the Deputy Mayor all serve two year terms. The Mayor is elected for three years and is eligible to serve a second term in office, whilst the Administrator is appointed by the Governor for an indefinite term.

History
The presiding officer of the council was traditionally the Magistrate, who held executive, legislative, and judicial authority.  Following a constitutional review in 1998, this office was divided and replaced by the Mayor and the council chairman, effective from 1999.

Until 2011 the Governor appointed a second member of the Council. However, this position was scrapped in favour of introducing the fifth elected seat.

Council membership
As of 9 August 2022, the composition of the Island Council was:

Voting members:
Mayor: Simon Young
Deputy Mayor: Shawn Christian
Councillors: Michele Christian, Heather Menzies, Simon Young, Torika Christian, and Leslie Jaques

Non-voting (ex-officio) Members:
Administrator : Fiona Kilpatrick & Steve Townsend  (Joint Administrators).
Governor: Iona Thomas
Deputy Governor: Alasdair Hamilton

References

Government of the Pitcairn Islands
Pitcairn
Politics of the Pitcairn Islands
Pitcairn Islands
Pitcairn Islands law
British Overseas Territories courts
Adamstown, Pitcairn Islands
Organisations based in the Pitcairn Islands